Maurice Davies may refer to:
M. C. Davies (Maurice Coleman Davies, 1835–1913), timber miller in the early history of Western Australia
Maurice Davies (MP), member of parliament for Caernarfon in 1559
Maurice Davies, maker of Bell plate
Maurice Davies, open world champion, see Tornado

See also
Morris Davies (1780–1861), Welsh poet
Maurice Davis (disambiguation)
Morris Davis (disambiguation)